Gierek is a 2022 Polish biographical film directed by Michał Węgrzyn. It is based on the life of Edward Gierek, the First Secretary of the Central Committee of the Polish United Workers' Party from 1970 to 1980, who in the movie is performed by Michał Koterski. The script was written by Heatcliff Janusz Iwanowski, Michał Kalicki, Krzysztof Nowak-Tyszowiecki and Rafał Woś. It was produced by Global Studio and distributed by Dystrybucja Mówi Serwis. The production started on 27 July 2020. The film was set to premiere on 15 October 2021, but was eventually moved to 21 January 2022. It was filmed in Katowice, Ustroń, Dąbrowa Górnicza, and Zawiercie.

Plot 
The film tells the history of Edward Gierek, from taking over the position of First Secretary in 1970 until his internment in 1982. The plot mainly focuses on Gierek's attempts at reviving the Polish economy with foreign loans and the crisis that followed.

Cast 
 Michał Koterski – Edward Gierek, First Secretary of the Central Committee of the Polish United Workers' Party from 1970 to 1980
 Małgorzata Kożuchowska – Stanisława Gierek, wife of Gierek
 Rafał Zawierucha – Piotr Jaroszewicz, Prime Minister of Poland from 1970 to 1980
 Jan Frycz – Stefan Wyszyński, Primate of Poland from 1948 to 1981
 Agnieszka Więdłocha – Marzena, secretary of Gierek
 Cezary Żak – Leonid Brezhnev, leader of the Soviet Union from 1964 to 1982
 Nicole Bogdanowicz – secretary of Gierek
 Ewa Ziętek – Paulina, mother of Gierek
 Natalia Lesz – singer Stella
 Sebastian Stankiewicz – Maślak, based on Stanisław Kania
 Antoni Pawlicki – general Roztocki, based on general Wojciech Jaruzelski
 Dominika Gwit – secretary
 Maciej Zakościelny – scientist-general, based on Sylwester Kaliski
 Klaudia Halejcio – secretary Ryba
 Mikołaj Roznerski – shipyard worker
 Krzysztof Tyniec – KGB general, based on Yuri Anropov
 Piotr Witkowski – banker
 Philippe Tłokiński – Pierre Lavale, banker
 Damian Bajorek – Wasiak, assistant of Gierek 
 Kamil Bajorek – SB officer Jeziorak
 Jakub Józefowicz -  ZSMP member Aleksander,
 Konrad Marszałek – Czesiek, adjutant

References

External links 
 
 Gierek in FilmPolski.pl (Polish)

2022 films
Polish historical films
Polish biographical films
Biographical films about politicians
Films about communism
2022 biographical drama films
2020s Polish-language films